Shariyah may refer to:

 Shāriyah, poet and musician, c. 815-70.

See also

 Sharia